Renata Vesecká (born c. 1960) served as State Attorney for the Czech Republic from 2005 until 2010.

Vesecká served previously as District State Attorney for Hradec Králové in eastern Bohemia. She became Acting Supreme State Attorney in 2005, following the recall of the previous incumbent Marie Benešová after several disagreements with justice minister Pavel Němec. Vesecká was appointed formally to the role on November 9, 2005. On her appointment, Vesecká pledged to concentrate on the handling of bankruptcy, corruption, and terrorism cases, implement investigations into past war crimes, and to increase the number of state attorneys in the state's employ.

In 2009 the opposition Czech Social Democratic Party (ČSSD) and the Green Party (SZ) both demanded that Vesecká leave her post, citing concerns over the failed prosecution of Jiří Čunek, former deputy prime minister and chairman of the KDU-CSL party (the junior party in the governing coalition). Čunek had faced charges of corruption over an alleged 500,000-koruna bribe from the H&B Real Estate company, but his case was thrown out in late 2007. The dismissal of Čunek's case had in turn been criticized by Adam Basny, the District State Attorney for Liberec, whom Vesecká had then fired. Basny's dismissal prompted criticism from outside the Czech Republic and within: Transparency International, a corruption watchdog, said that if the state attorney's office was prepared to fire dissenters within its own ranks, it might next pursue opponents in wider Czech society. Vesecká also faced criticism from her predecessor Benesova, who accused Vesecká of membership in a "judiciary mafia". The two opposition parties insisted that without Vesecká's departure they would not support the governing coalition, which had fallen following a vote of no confidence in its handling of the ongoing global financial crisis, but was expected to continue governing until an early election in October 2009. The Czech Association of State Attorneys in March 2009 also called on Vesecká to leave, but the governing Civic Democrats rejected calls for her removal. Vesecka has also been referred to as "she is going to go to jail" by Kristyna Koci, as she was being secretly taped in Spring 2011, trying to split her own party VV(Public affairs) by performing a coup based on bribery accusations with the help of Petr Tluchor and some other Civic Democrats.

References

1960s births
Living people
20th-century Czech lawyers
Czech women lawyers
Place of birth missing (living people)
21st-century Czech lawyers